Magic and Movement is a live album by American saxophonist and composer John Klemmer featuring studio enhanced live performances recorded in Los Angeles for the Impulse! label.

Reception
The Allmusic review awarded the album 3½ stars.

Track listing
All compositions by John Klemmer
 "Blood of the Sun, Primary Pulse" - 3:40   
 "Blood of the Sun, Secondary Pulse" - 4:36   
 "Blood of the Sun, Tertiary Pulse" - 8:01   
 "How Cum Ya Gotta Rip Off Your Brothers?" - 5:51   
 "Free Love" - 7:41   
 "The Tree of Forbidden Fruit, Alpha Branch" - 6:24   
 "The Tree of Forbidden Fruit, Beta Branch" - 1:53   
 "The Tree of Forbidden Fruit, Gamma Branch" - 6:10  
Recorded in performance at the Ash Grove in Los Angeles, California on June 22, 1972 with overdubs recorded at Royal Hidley Hall in Los Angeles, California on March 19, 1974 (tracks 1-4) and at the Montreux Jazz Festival in Montreux, Switzerland in July 6, 1973 (tracks 5-8)

Personnel
John Klemmer - tenor saxophone, soprano saxophone, echoplex, phasing, vocals, percussion
Tom Canning (tracks 5-8), Mike Nock (tracks 1-4) - electric piano 
Wilton Felder - electric bass (tracks 1-4)
Cecil McBee - bass (tracks 5-8)
Eddie Marshall (tracks 1-4), Alphonse Mouzon (tracks 5-8) - drums
Peter Ivers - harmonica (overdubbed on tracks 1-4)
Dean Parks - electric guitar (overdubbed on tracks 1-4)

References

Impulse! Records live albums
John Klemmer albums
1974 live albums